Law and Order is a 1940 American western film directed by Ray Taylor and starring Johnny Mack Brown, Nell O'Day and James Craig. It was produced as a second feature by Universal Pictures. Shooting took place at Universal Studios and the Iverson Ranch.The film's sets were designed by the art director Jack Otterson.

Plot summary
Bill Ralston arrives in town planning to settle down but quickly gets caught up in the fight between the townspeople and Poe Daggett and his gang. He takes the job of town Marshal and soon brings law and order. When Daggetts men ambush him he kills Poe's brother. Poe then kills Bill's friend Brant and this leads to the showdown.

Cast
Johnny Mack Brown as Bill Ralston
Fuzzy Knight as Deadwood
Nell O'Day as Sally Dixon
James Craig as Brant
Harry Cording as Poe Daggett
Earle Hodgins as Sheriff Fin Elder
Robert Fiske as Ed Deal
Jimmie Dodd as Jimmy Dixon
William Worthington as Judge Williams
Ted Adams as Walt Daggett
Ethan Laidlaw as Kurt Daggett
George Plues as Stage Driver
Harry Humphrey as Cal Dixon
 Kermit Maynard as 	Henchman 
 Eddie Polo as Bartender Ed 
 Lew Meehan as Voting Official
 Bob Kortman as Henchman Pete

References

Bibliography
 Pitts, Michael R. Western Movies: A Guide to 5,105 Feature Films. McFarland, 2012.

External links

1940 films
American black-and-white films
1940 Western (genre) films
American Western (genre) films
Remakes of American films
Films based on American novels
Films based on works by W. R. Burnett
Films directed by Ray Taylor
Universal Pictures films
1940s English-language films
1940s American films